The many-striped canastero (Asthenes flammulata) is a species of passerine bird in the family Furnariidae (Ovenbirds) that is native to the Andes in Colombia, Ecuador, and Peru.

Taxonomy 
The many-striped canastero is a member of the genus Asthenes. It was described by William Jardine in 1850, from a specimen taken in Andean tablelands near Quito. The nominotypical subspecies Asthenes flammulata flammulata was known as Jardine's spine-tail.
Five subspecies are recognized:
Asthenes flammulata multostriata (Sclater, 1858) - eastern Andes of Colombia
Asthenes flammulata quindiana (Chapman, 1915) - central Andes of Colombia
Asthenes flammulata flammulata (Jardine, 1850) - Colombia, Ecuador and Peru
Asthenes flammulata pallida Carriker, 1933 - northwestern Peru
Asthenes flammulata taczanowskii (von Berlepsch & Stolzmann, 1894) - north and central Peru

Description 

The many-striped canastero is a small suboscine passerine bird, measuring approximately 16—18cm (6.25—7 inches). It is brown-black above, with fine tawny streaking on the crown, ochraceous streaking on the mantle, a slender buff eyebrow, rufous-chestnut colouration in the flight feathers, and orange-buff on the face and chin. Individuals in the Colombian East Andes tend to have darker chin patches, while those in Peru have paler white throats and more minimal streaking. It is visually similar and can be mistaken for the streak-backed canastero (Asthenes wyatti), but is more more heavily streaked overall and has more obvious distinction between colours.

The song is a dry, accelerating trill that descends in pitch. Calls are varied, and include low descending "mew" calls, low pitches "weeew" notes that rise and then fall in pitch, and low buzzy notes.

Behaviour and distribution 
The many-striped canastero is found in the Andes, from Norte de Santander south through Central Peru, with local distribution in Ancash and Junín. It is widely distributed in high altitude (2900—4400m) grasslands, and is common in páramo and puna grassland with scattered shrubs. It forages on and near the ground by hopping and running. Many-striped canasteros tend to keep their tails in a cocked posture. They can be inconspicuous, skulking and sneaking, but will perch openly when calm, especially early in the day. When flushed they fly for short stretches and duck into cover quickly.

It is replaced in central and southern Peru by the Junín canastero (Asthenes virgata), and though the species are visually similar there is minimal overlap in their range distribution. Hybridization with the Junín canastero has been identified, which may result in a morphologically intermediate population in Central Peru.

References

many-striped canastero
Birds of the Northern Andes
many-striped canastero
Taxonomy articles created by Polbot